Alexander Keith (5 October 1795 – 14 December 1873) was the founder of Alexander Keith's Brewery, a businessman, politician and Freemason.

Business
After learning the brewing trade from his uncle in Northern England, Keith emigrated to Halifax, Nova Scotia in 1817 and became manager at a brewery, which he bought out in 1820. In 1822, he moved the brewery to larger facilities and, in 1836, built a new brewery.

The end of slavery in the British and French Caribbean reduced the availability of sugar for rum-making, and other beverages grew in popularity. Beverages brewed by Keith included spruce beer, porter, ginger wine, and strong ale. 
The brewery is now part of Anheuser-Busch InBev.

From 1837, he served in senior management of various companies, including the Bank of Nova Scotia, the Halifax Fire Insurance Company, Colonial Life Assurance Company, the Halifax Gas, Light, and Water Company, the Provincial Permanent Building, and Investment Society.

Political career
In 1841, he was elected to the city council of Halifax and was elected mayor in 1843, 1853, and 1854. In 1843, he was appointed to the Legislative Council of Nova Scotia, becoming its president from 1867 until his death in 1873.

Keith served with several fraternal and charitable societies, including as president of the North British Society and Grand Master of the Freemasons.

Personal life
Born in Caithness, Scotland, in 1795 he immigrated to Nova Scotia in 1817. Keith married Sarah Ann Stalcup in 1822, and they had three children, all of whom died before reaching adulthood. Sarah Ann Stalcup died in 1832, and a year later, Keith married Eliza Keith, with whom he had eight children. Architect William Hay began construction of Keith's new residence, Keith Hall, in 1863. The palazzo mixes styles including baroque and a mansard roof. He died in Halifax in 1873 and is buried at Camp Hill Cemetery. His estate at death was evaluated at $251,000.

Gallery

See also
Alexander Keith Jr.: Keith's nephew, a criminal and Confederate secret agent. In 1875 he used a time bomb to attempt to destroy the ship Mosel  in Bremerhaven, Germany so he could collect on an insurance fraud scheme.

References

1795 births
1873 deaths
Pre-Confederation Canadian businesspeople
People from Caithness
Progressive Conservative Association of Nova Scotia MLAs
Mayors of Halifax, Nova Scotia
Conservative Party of Nova Scotia MLCs
Colony of Nova Scotia people
Scottish emigrants to pre-Confederation Nova Scotia
Scottish businesspeople
Canadian brewers
Dalhousie University alumni
Members of the Legislative Council of Nova Scotia
Canadian Freemasons
19th-century British businesspeople